Narsingh ji temple is located in Amer, Jaipur, India. It is situated near to the down side of the Amer fort. Narsingh temple was the first and old Amer palace used by the Kachwaha Kings of Amber. Originally, it was used by the meena king s of Susavat dynasty. Narsingh temple is known for its historical story rather than its architecture.

References 

Temples in Rajasthan
Buildings and structures in Jaipur district